The 2015 Hell in a Cell was the seventh annual Hell in a Cell professional wrestling pay-per-view and livestreaming event produced by WWE. It took place on October 25, 2015, at Staples Center in Los Angeles, California. This was the first WWE pay-per-view, other than SummerSlam, to be held in the city of Los Angeles since No Way Out in February 2007. This was also the last Hell in a Cell event to be held before the reintroduction of the brand extension in July 2016.

Eight matches were contested at the event, with one match on the Kickoff pre-show. In the main event, Brock Lesnar defeated The Undertaker in a Hell in a Cell match, their second  match against each other in a Hell in a Cell match, the first one being at No Mercy in October 2002. Also at the event, Alberto Del Rio, who last wrestled for WWE in 2014, returned to answer John Cena's open challenge and defeat him to win the WWE United States Championship in the opening bout.

Production

Background 
Hell in a Cell is a gimmick pay-per-view (PPV) and WWE Network event produced annually in October by WWE since 2009. The concept of the show comes from WWE's established Hell in a Cell match, in which competitors fight inside a 20-foot-high roofed cell structure surrounding the ring and ringside area. The main event match of the card is contested under the Hell in a Cell stipulation. The 2015 event was the seventh event under the Hell in a Cell chronology and was held on October 25 at Staples Center in Los Angeles, California.

Storylines 
The card consisted of eight matches, including one of the Kickoff pre-show, that resulted from scripted storylines, where wrestlers portrayed villains, heroes, or less distinguishable characters in scripted events that built tension and culminated in a wrestling match or series of matches, with results predetermined by WWE's writers. Storylines between the characters played out on WWE's primary television programs, Raw and SmackDown.

At WrestleMania XXX in 2014, Brock Lesnar defeated The Undertaker to end the streak. A year later at Battleground, Lesnar was about to defeat Seth Rollins for the WWE World Heavyweight Championship, when the lights went out and Undertaker attacked Lesnar; Lesnar won the match by disqualification but not the title. After a vicious brawl between the two on Raw, they would face in a rematch at SummerSlam. Undertaker defeated Lesnar in controversial fashion; the timekeeper ringing the bell after seeing the Undertaker supposedly indicating submission; since the referee hadn't see a submission and never stopped the match, the match continued. The confusion allowed Undertaker to surprise Lesnar with a low blow before trapping him in the Hell's Gate submission hold, causing Lesnar to pass out, giving Undertaker the win. At Night of Champions, Lesnar was scheduled to face Undertaker one last time in a Hell in a Cell match at the eponymous event. This would be their second match inside the structure against each other, as they faced 13 years ago for the WWE Championship at No Mercy in 2002.

At Money in the Bank, Bray Wyatt cost Roman Reigns the titular ladder match, sparking a feud between the two. This led to a match at Battleground where Wyatt defeated Reigns after interference from his former Wyatt Family member Luke Harper. The feud continued into SummerSlam where Reigns recruited former Shield partner Dean Ambrose to face Wyatt and Harper in a tag team match, which Reigns and Ambrose won. Then at Night of Champions, Wyatt, Harper and recent new member Braun Strowman faced off against Reigns, Ambrose and their mystery partner Chris Jericho in a six-man tag team match, which was won by The Wyatt Family. On the September 21 episode of Raw, Randy Orton helped Reigns and Ambrose fend off an attack by Wyatt, Harper and Strowman. Subsequently, Reigns challenged Wyatt to a Hell in a Cell match at the event, which Wyatt accepted in what was to be their final encounter. A match pitting Ambrose and Orton against Harper and Strowman was also scheduled for the Hell in a Cell Kickoff pre-show but after Orton suffered a shoulder injury, the match was cancelled.

At Night of Champions, Kane returned from injury as "Demon" Kane and attacked Seth Rollins after Rollins retained the WWE World Heavyweight Championship against Sting. At Live from Madison Square Garden, Demon Kane attacked Rollins after Rollins lost to John Cena in a steel cage match. Subsequently, Rollins was scheduled to defend his title against Demon Kane at the event, but that should Demon Kane lose, Corporate Kane, Kane's alter ego, would be fired from his role as Director of Operations.

At Night of Champions, The Dudley Boyz had defeated WWE Tag Team Champions The New Day by disqualification, therefore not winning the titles. At Live from Madison Square Garden, The Dudley Boyz again won by disqualification. This led to another rematch for the title at Hell in a Cell.

The event also included two more rematches from Night of Champions: Charlotte had defeated Nikki Bella to win the Divas Championship and Kevin Owens had defeated Ryback to win the Intercontinental Championship. Both champions had to defend their newly won titles against the former champions.

An open challenge title defense by United States Champion John Cena was also scheduled for the event.

On the October 19 edition of Raw, Sheamus, King Barrett, and Rusev defeated Dolph Ziggler, Cesaro, and Neville. Later that night, a rematch between the trios was scheduled for the Hell in a Cell Kickoff pre-show.

Event

Pre-show 
During the Hell in a Cell Kickoff pre-show, Sheamus, King Barrett, and Rusev faced Dolph Ziggler, Cesaro, and Neville. In the end, Ziggler performed a superkick on Barrett and Cesaro performed a Cesaro Swing on Barrett. Neville executed a Red Arrow on Barrett to win the match.

Preliminary matches 
The actual pay-per-view opened with John Cena's open Challenge for the WWE United States Championship. Zeb Colter interrupted Cena's pre-match promo, introducing the returning Alberto Del Rio as Cena's opponent. The ending saw Del Rio counter an Attitude Adjustment, perform a backstabber and a superkick on a kneeling Cena, and pinned him to win the title for the first time.

Next, Roman Reigns faced Bray Wyatt in a Hell in a Cell match. During the match, Wyatt performed a side slam off the ring apron though a table on Reigns and scored a near-fall. Reigns performed a powerbomb on Wyatt through a table for a near-fall. Reigns performed a spear on Wyatt off the ring apron through a table and pinned Wyatt for a near-fall. Reigns attempted another spear only for Wyatt to counter it into a Sister Abigail on Reigns for a near-fall. In the end, Reigns threw Wyatt into a kendo stick wedged in the padding of a turnbuckle and pinned Wyatt after a spear to win the match.

After that, The New Day (Big E and Kofi Kingston) defended the WWE Tag Team Championship against The Dudley Boyz (Bubba Ray Dudley and D-Von Dudley). In the end, Big E hit Bubba Ray with Xavier Woods' trombone. Kingston pinned Bubba Ray after performing Trouble in Paradise to retain the titles.

In the fourth match, Charlotte defended the WWE Divas Championship against Nikki Bella. The match ended when Charlotte forced Nikki to submit to the Figure-Eight Leglock to retain the title.

After that, Seth Rollins defended the WWE World Heavyweight Championship against Kane. During the match, Kane performed a chokelslam on Rollins for a near-fall. Kane attempted another chokeslam through a broadcast table on Rollins, but Rollins countered with a powerbomb onto another broadcast table. In the end, Kane attempted another chokeslam, however Rollins pinned Kane after a Pedigree to retain the title.

In the penultimate match, Kevin Owens defended the WWE Intercontinental Championship against Ryback. The match ended when Owens pinned Ryback after a Pop-up powerbomb to retain the title.

Main event
In the main event, Brock Lesnar faced The Undertaker in a Hell in a Cell match. During the match, Undertaker shoved Lesnar into the ring post, causing Lesnar to bleed profusely for which he needed medical intervention and 8 stitches post-match. Lesnar hit Undertaker with a steel chair, causing Undertaker to bleed. Undertaker drove the chair into Lesnar's throat for a near-fall. Lesnar performed two F-5s on Undertaker for near-falls. Lesnar struck Undertaker with the steel steps for a near-fall. Undertaker applied the Hell's Gate on Lesnar, but Lesnar fought out of it. At the end of the match, Lesnar removed the ring cover, exposing the ring floor underneath. Undertaker executed a chokeslam and a Tombstone Piledriver on Lesnar, both onto the exposed ring floor, for a near-fall. In the end, Lesnar attacked Undertaker with a low blow and executed a third F-5 on Undertaker onto the exposed ring floor to win the match.

After the match, The Wyatt Family (Bray Wyatt, Luke Harper, Erick Rowan and Braun Strowman) attacked Undertaker. Undertaker fought back, but they eventually overpowered him and carried him away.

Reception 
The event received generally positive reviews from critics. Larry Csonka from 411MANIA gave the event a 7/10. He praised Wyatt vs. Reigns and Lesnar vs. Undertaker saying that both matches delivered. The main event went on to win the Slammy Award for Match of the Year.

Aftermath 
The night following the event, on Raw, Bray Wyatt explained that he wanted to claim The Undertaker's Soul and obtain its powers. Kane then tried to attack Wyatt but got ambushed and attacked by The Wyatt Family and was also carried out to the backstage. On the November 9 episode of Raw, The Undertaker and Kane reemerged and attacked The Wyatt Family. On the November 12 episode of Smackdown, Wyatt challenged The Undertaker and Kane to a tag team match at Survivor Series against two members of The Wyatt Family of his choosing, which they accepted later that night.

On the Raw following the event, The Authority held a tournament by pitting the winners of their respective matches at Hell in a Cell against each other to determine the next number one contender to Seth Rollins's WWE World Heavyweight Championship. Roman Reigns would win the final Fatal 4-Way match also involving Dolph Ziggler, Kevin Owens, and Alberto Del Rio to become the number one contender and face Rollins for the championship scheduled for Survivor Series. On November 4, however, Rollins suffered multiple knee injuries during a house show in Dublin, Ireland and was forced to vacate the title. A tournament was then scheduled to determine the new champion, running through the weeks leading up to Survivor Series, with the semi-finals and finals held at Survivor Series. In the semi-finals, Reigns and Dean Ambrose advanced to the finals by defeating Del Rio and Owens respectively. Reigns then defeated Ambrose in the tournament final to win the vacant WWE World Heavyweight Championship, but he lost it immediately afterwards when Sheamus cashed-in his Money in the Bank contract and pinned him for the title.

On the October 26 episode of Raw, Paige continued to persuade Charlotte and Becky Lynch that she did not attack Natalya. While still not convinced, Charlotte and Becky allowed Paige to join them as PCB and faced Team Bella on that night in a losing effort. After the match, Paige attacked Charlotte and Becky, cementing her heel turn. On the November 2 episode of Raw, Paige defeated Becky, Sasha Banks and Brie Bella in a Fatal 4-Way match to determine the number one contender for the WWE Divas Championship.

After Hell in a Cell, Jack Swagger briefly feuded with Alberto Del Rio after confronting Zeb Colter about joining Del Rio. Swagger saved Neville, who was assaulted by Del Rio after a match but lost to Del Rio in a Chairs Match at TLC. Meanwhile, John Cena took a hiatus from wrestling to film the reality series American Grit. He returned on the December 28 episode of Raw and challenged Del Rio to a title match, which Cena won by disqualification after The League of Nations interfered. Cena then took more time off after undergoing shoulder surgery on January 7, 2016, but introduced Kalisto to challenge Del Rio in his stead. Kalisto defeated Del Rio for the US championship. Cena did not return full-time until the May 30 episode of Raw.

The 2015 Hell in a Cell was the final Hell in a Cell event held before the reintroduction of the brand extension in July 2016, in which WWE again split the roster between the Raw and SmackDown brands where wrestlers were exclusively assigned to perform. Along with this second brand split came brand-exclusive PPVs, and the 2016 event was held exclusively for the Raw brand.

Results

References

External links 

2015
Professional wrestling in Los Angeles
2015 in Los Angeles
2015 WWE Network events
Events in Los Angeles
2015 WWE pay-per-view events
October 2015 events in the United States